Alan Kay is a computer scientist known for his work at the Xerox Palo Alto Research Center.

Alan Kay may also refer to:

 Alan Kay (judge), US magistrate judge in Washington DC
 Alan Cooke Kay (born 1932), US District Court judge for the District of Hawaii
 Alan Kay (footballer) (born 1961), Scottish footballer
 Alan Kay, season 1 winner of the TV series Alone

See also
 Alan Kaye (disambiguation)
 Allen Kay (born 1945), American advertising executive
 Allan K. (born 1958), Filipino entertainer